Miroslav Radulović, better known as Mirče (Serbian Cyrillic: Мирослав Радуловић Мирче) (born May 20, 1992, in Kruševac, Serbia) is a Serbian pop-folk singer.

He competed in the 2011–12 season of the televised singing contest Zvezde Granda. He finished in 4th place but was signed to the record label Grand Production. His single "Njeno" premiered on June 30, 2012.
After a long break, he released song "Placite oci moje" in 2016.

Discography

Singles 
 Fatalna (2009)
 Njeno (2012)
 Placite oci moje (2016)

References

External links 
 Official Facebook
 Official YouTube Channel
 Profile on Discogs.com

1992 births
Living people
Musicians from Kruševac
People from Trstenik, Serbia
21st-century Serbian male singers
Serbian turbo-folk singers
Grand Production artists